Harry Mortlock (13 October 1892 – 29 March 1963) was an English cricketer. He played for Essex between 1912 and 1921.

References

External links

1892 births
1963 deaths
English cricketers
Essex cricketers
Cricketers from Greater London
People from Hackney Central